Silvaninae is a subfamily of silvanid flat bark beetles in the family Silvanidae. There are about 11 genera and at least 30 described species in Silvaninae.

Genera
 Ahasverus Gozis, 1881
 Airaphilus Redtenbacher, 1858
 Cathartosilvanus Grouvelle, 1912
 Cathartus Reiche, 1854
 Eunausibius Grouvelle, 1912
 Monanus Sharp, 1879
 Nausibius Lentz, 1857
 Oryzaephilus Ganglbauer, 1899
 Pensus Halstead, 1973
 Silvanoprus Reitter, 1911
 Silvanus Latreille, 1804

References

Further reading

 
 
 

Silvanidae